Paper flower may refer to:

 A type of artificial flower

Bougainvillea, a plant
Psilostrophe cooperi, a plant
Paper Flower (film), a 2011 film directed and produced by Brent Ryan Green

See also 
 Paper Flowers (disambiguation)